Pareutropius is a genus of schilbid catfishes native to Africa.

Species
There are currently four recognized species in this genus:
 Pareutropius buffei (Gras, 1961)
 Pareutropius debauwi (Boulenger, 1900) (African glass catfish)
 Pareutropius longifilis (Steindachner, 1914)
 Pareutropius mandevillei Poll, 1959

References
 

 
Schilbeidae

Freshwater fish genera
Catfish genera
Taxa named by Charles Tate Regan
Taxonomy articles created by Polbot